BNS Osman was a modified Type 053H frigate of the Bangladesh Navy, bought in 1988 from China. She was the first guided missile frigate to enter service with the Bangladesh Navy. The ship was named after the third Rashidun Caliph Uthman.

Design

Armament
The ship's primary armament consisted of eight C-802 anti-ship missiles. Her secondary armament consisted of two twin 100 mm guns, mounted on the bow and stern. Anti-aircraft armament consisted of four twin 37mm guns. For anti-submarine warfare, she was equipped with two RBU-1200 anti-submarine rocket launchers and two BMB-2 depth charge mortars. She could carry up to 60 mines.

Electronics
Osman was equipped with one MX 902 radar for air and surface search and one Type 352 Square Tie radar for surface search and fire control. One Type 352 radar was present for navigational purpose. I band Type 752A and Type 254 radar was present on the ship as fire control radar for different weapons. An Echo Type 5 hull mounted sonar was there for underwater detection.

History
The Type 053H1 Frigate Osman was previously known as Xiangtan, which served with People's Liberation Army Navy (PLAN) in South Sea Fleet. The ship was commissioned in PLAN on 20 December 1987. In PLAN service, this ship participated in the Johnson South Reef Skirmish against the Vietnamese Navy on 14 March 1988 and sank the Vietnamese transport ship HQ-605. In 1989 the ship was sold to the Bangladesh Navy. She was commissioned into the Bangladesh Navy as Osman on 4 November 1989. She is the first guided missile frigate to enter in service with the Bangladesh Navy.

Career
Osman was based at Chattogram, serving with the Commodore Commanding BN Flotilla (COMBAN). About 250 personnel served aboard Osman, with most living on board. She was the first frigate of Bangladesh Navy who test fired C-802A missile in Bay of Bengal on 12 May 2008, which successfully hit the target. The ship had gone through major upgrades which included replacement of propulsion system, new missile launching platforms and an addition of a combat data link.

Osman was deployed to Lebanon with the UN mission United Nations Interim Force in Lebanon (UNIFIL) from 17 May 2010 to 14 June 2014. She returned to Bangladesh on 11 August 2014. On her way, she visited the Port of Salalah and Port Sultan Qaboos of Oman, Port of Colombo of Sri Lanka and Mumbai and Chennai Port of India on a goodwill mission.

On 11 October 2014, Osman was awarded the title of National Standard in recognition of the ship's quarter century of outstanding service in the Bangladesh Navy at home and abroad.

After serving the Bangladesh Navy for around 31 years, the ship was decommissioned in 2020. Later on, she was scrapped.

See also
 List of historic ships of the Bangladesh Navy

References

External links
BNS Osman’s Photo

Ships of the Bangladesh Navy
Frigates of the Bangladesh Navy
Type 053H1 frigates of the Bangladesh Navy
1987 ships